Ricky N. Rupp is a United States Air Force lieutenant general who serves as the commander of United States Forces Japan and Fifth Air Force since August 26, 2021. He most recently served as the commander of Air Force District of Washington. Previously, he was the director of operations of the United States Transportation Command.

In July 2021, he was nominated for promotion to lieutenant general and assignment as the commander of Fifth Air Force and the United States Forces Japan, succeeding Kevin Schneider.

Awards and decorations

Effective dates of promotions

References

External links

Year of birth missing (living people)
Living people
Place of birth missing (living people)
United States Air Force generals
Recipients of the Air Force Distinguished Service Medal
Recipients of the Defense Superior Service Medal
Recipients of the Legion of Merit